Ab urbe condita ( 'from the founding of the City'), or anno urbis conditae ('in the year since the city's founding'), abbreviated as AUC or AVC, expresses a date in years since 753 BC, the traditional founding of Rome. It is an expression used in antiquity and by classical historians to refer to a given year in Ancient Rome. In reference to the traditional year of the foundation of Rome, the year 1 BC would be written AUC 753, whereas AD 1 would be AUC 754. The foundation of the Roman Empire in 27 BC would be AUC 727. The current year AD   would be AUC .

Usage of the term was more common during the Renaissance, when editors sometimes added AUC to Roman manuscripts they published, giving the false impression that the convention was commonly used in antiquity. In reality, the dominant method of identifying years in Roman times was to name the two consuls who held office that year. In late antiquity, regnal years were also in use, as in Roman Egypt during the Diocletian era after AD 293, and in the Byzantine Empire from AD 537, following a decree by Justinian.

Significance
The traditional date for the founding of Rome, 21 April 753 BC, is due to Marcus Terentius Varro (1st century BC). Varro may have used the consular list (with its mistakes) and called the year of the first consuls "ab Urbe condita 245," accepting the 244-year interval from Dionysius of Halicarnassus for the kings after the foundation of Rome. The correctness of this calculation has not been confirmed, but it is still used worldwide.

From the time of Claudius (fl. AD 41 to AD 54) onward, this calculation superseded other contemporary calculations. Celebrating the anniversary of the city became part of imperial propaganda. Claudius was the first to hold magnificent celebrations in honor of the anniversary of the city, in AD 48, the eight hundredth year from the founding of the city. Hadrian, in AD 121, and Antoninus Pius, in AD 147 and AD 148, held similar celebrations respectively.

In AD 248, Philip the Arab celebrated Rome's first millennium, together with Ludi saeculares for Rome's alleged tenth saeculum. Coins from his reign commemorate the celebrations. A coin by a contender for the imperial throne, Pacatianus, explicitly states "[y]ear one thousand and first," which is an indication that the citizens of the empire had a sense of the beginning of a new era, a Sæculum Novum.

Calendar era

The Anno Domini (AD) year numbering was developed by a monk named Dionysius Exiguus in Rome in AD 525, as a result of his work on calculating the date of Easter. Dionysius did not use the AUC convention, but instead based his calculations on the Diocletian era. This convention had been in use since AD 293, the year of the tetrarchy, as it became impractical to use regnal years of the current emperor. In his Easter table, the year AD 532 was equated with the 248th regnal year of Diocletian. The table counted the years starting from the presumed birth of Christ, rather than the accession of the emperor Diocletian on 20 November AD 284 or, as stated by Dionysius: "sed magis elegimus ab incarnatione Domini nostri Jesu Christi annorum tempora praenotare" ("but rather we choose to name the times of the years from the incarnation of our Lord Jesus Christ"). Blackburn and Holford-Strevens review interpretations of Dionysius which place the Incarnation in 2 BC, 1 BC, or AD 1.

The year AD 1 corresponds to AUC 754, based on the epoch of Varro. Thus:

See also

 Calendar era
 History of Italy
 List of Latin phrases
 Roman calendar

Citations

External links 
 

1st-century BC establishments in the Roman Empire
8th century BC in the Roman Kingdom
Calendar eras
Chronology
Latin words and phrases
Roman calendar
Diocletian